Skogbygda is a village in Sel Municipality in Innlandet county, Norway. The rural farming village area is predominantly agricultural, counting a few dozen farms, the main ones being Steine (cadastral number 176), Brenna (177), Holen (178), Kagrud (179) and Åseng (180).

References

Sel
Villages in Innlandet